Billy Winn (August 27, 1909 – August 20, 1938) was an American racecar driver.  Primarily a sprint car driver, Winn competed in four Indianapolis 500 races (1931, 1932, 1936, and 1937) and drove as a relief driver in 1933, 1934, 1935, and 1938.  He also drove his single-gear sprint car in the 1936 and 1937 Vanderbilt Cup races, running near the front of both races but being sidelined by mechanical failure both years.

Winn was killed in a non-points paying AAA Champ Car event held at the Illinois State Fairgrounds on August 20, 1938 when tire failure caused Winn's Miller to overturn on the fourth lap of the 100-mile race.

Award
Winn was inducted in the National Sprint Car Hall of Fame in 2003.

Indianapolis 500 results

References

External links

1909 births
1938 deaths
People from Weston, Missouri
Sportspeople from Kansas City, Missouri
Racing drivers from Missouri
Indianapolis 500 drivers
AAA Championship Car drivers
Racing drivers who died while racing
Sports deaths in Illinois
National Sprint Car Hall of Fame inductees